The Third League of Montenegro (Montenegrin: Treća Crnogorska Liga / Трећа црногорска лига) is the third and lowest-tier football league in Montenegro. It is headed by the regional unions of the Football Association of Montenegro (Union of the clubs - North, Union of the clubs - Center, Union of the clubs - South), under the Football Association of Montenegro. In the 2020-21 season, 30 teams participated, divided into three regions. The top team from each region qualifies for the playoff from which the top team qualify for the Second League of Montenegro.

History

Regional leagues as a lowest-tier competition in Montenegro, were founded in 1968. The format and system of competition has not changed. From 1968 to 2006, it was the fourth or fifth level of competition in SFR Yugoslavia, FR Yugoslavia and Serbia and Montenegro. Following Montenegrin independence (2006), regional leagues became the third tier in the organisation of domestic football competitions.
From 1968 until now, the league is divided on three regions - North (clubs from territories of Berane, Bijelo Polje, Gusinje, Mojkovac, Petnjica, Plav, Pljevlja, Rožaje and Žabljak) Center (Podgorica with Golubovci and Tuzi, Danilovgrad, Kolašin, Nikšić, Plužine and Šavnik) and South (Bar, Budva, Cetinje, Herceg Novi, Kotor, Tivat and Ulcinj).
At period 1961–2006, winners of three regional leagues were promoted to Montenegrin Republic League (3rd tier) or played Montenegrin football playoffs.

Champions (2006-)

After independence of Montenegro, regional leagues, with the same format and divisions, became Third League, and also a lowest tier of competition. 
At the end of season, champions of each region qualifies for the playoff. Every season, two top teams from playoff are qualified for the Second League. 
Below is the list of Montenegrin Third League champions.

Key

Full list of champions of regional leagues before 2006, is available on the page Montenegrin clubs in Yugoslav football competitions (1946-2006).

Complete team list
From 2006, 57 different teams played in Montenegrin Third League. This is the complete list of the clubs that took part in 15 seasons played from 2006-07 to 2020-21, ranked by champion titles won in the Third League.

Ssn = Number of seasons; First = First season in Third League; Last = Last season in Third League; 1st = finishing as a champion of region; 2nd = finishing as a runner-up; 3rd = finishing as a third-placed team

Final placement by season

North
Since its establishing, in Montenegrin Third League - North participated overall 17 different teams. Most successful participants are FK Pljevlja, who won four titles. Except that, FK Pljevlja made the biggest win in some Montenegrin official men football competition - on season 2012-13, they defeated FK E-Roma 26-1 (14-0). During the same game, FK Pljevlja player Alen Pajević scored seven goals, which is an all-time record in Montenegrin Third League.
Among the other title winners in Third League - North are FK Brskovo (2), FK Polimlje (2), FK Petnjica (2), FK Berane (1), FK Ibar (1), FK Gusinje (1), FK Tekstilac (1) and FK Radnički (1).
Two teams, FK Komovi and FK Polimlje, participated in all the seasons of Third League - North.

07 = season 2006/07

Center
Overall 23 different clubs played in Montenegrin Third League - Central region since its establishing (2006–07). Most trophies won FK Iskra with three titles. Except them, among the champions were FK Zora (2), OFK Mladost DG (2) FK Kom (1), FK Ribnica (1), FK Podgorica (1), FK Grafičar (1), FK Bratstvo (1), FK Drezga (1) and FK Blue Star (1).
Owner of the biggest wins in the history of Montenegrin Third League - Center is FK Zabjelo, who defeated FK Ribnica away with result 20-0 (season 2019-20).

07 = season 2006/07

South
Since establishing, 16 different teams played in Montenegrin Third League - South region. Among them, most successes have FK Cetinje with four titles and FK Arsenal with three. Except them, winners of competition were also FK Otrant (2), FK Igalo (2), FK Mornar (1), OFK Bar (1), OFK Federal (1) and FK Sloga Radovići (1).
Since 2006, biggest win in Montenegrin Third League - South made FK Cetinje, who defeated FK Bijela with score 12-0 on season 2007-08. 
FK Sloga Bar is the only team which played every single season of Montenegrin Third League - South Region.

07 = season 2006/07

Promotion playoffs
Following the Montenegrin independence, from the season 2006/07, champions of three regional leagues are participating in the playoffs for Montenegrin Second League promotion. Until 2020, every team is played four matches, and at the end, best-placed are promoted to a higher rank. From 2020, every team is playing two games, and if there is no winner after 90 minutes, penalties are deciding about it. Two teams are gaining promotion to the Second League.
Playoffs are playing after the regular season, at the end of May and start of June every year.

Promotions by season
Until now, most promotions to Montenegrin Second League through playoffs gained FK Iskra (2), FK Arsenal (2), FK Otrant (2) and FK Igalo (2).

Promotions by region
During the history, most promotions to Montenegrin Second League gained teams from Central and South region. Representatives of that regions gained promotions via playyofs 11 times. Clubs from North region gained 8 promotions through playoffs.

Current season (2020-21)

For the 2020-21 season, Third league is divided in three geographical regions. Eight teams compete in the North, thirteen in the Center, and nine in the South.

North

The Third League - North is organised by Union of the clubs - North (covering municipalities of Pljevlja, Bijelo Polje, Berane, Rožaje, Plav, Gusinje, Mojkovac, Andrijevica, Žabljak, Šavnik and Plužine).

Center

The Third League - Center is organised by Union of the clubs - Center (Montenegrin: Udruženje klubova - Centar - FSCG). The Central region covers approximately 70% of Montenegrin territory. The municipalities within Central region include: Podgorica, Nikšić, Danilovgrad, Šavnik, Plužine and Kolašin, and Tuzi.

There are 13 clubs competing in Montenegrin Third League - Center during the season 2020-21.

South

The Third League - South is organised by Union of the clubs - South (Montenegrin: Udruženje klubova - Jug - FSCG). The municipalities within Southern region include: Cetinje, Kotor, Herceg Novi, Tivat, Budva, Bar and Ulcinj.

During the season 2020-21, there are nine clubs competing in the South region.

See also
Montenegrin Regional Cups
Football in Montenegro
Montenegrin clubs in Yugoslav football competitions (1946-2006)

External links
Football Association of Montenegro - Official Site
Football Association of the Central Region of Montenegro - Official Site
Football Association of the Southern Region of Montenegro - Official Site
Football Association of the Northern Region of Montenegro - Official Site

References

3
Third level football leagues in Europe
Sports leagues established in 2006
2006 establishments in Montenegro